San Giuseppe is a Roman Catholic, Franciscan church in Cagli, province of Pesaro e Urbino, region of Marche, Italy.

History
The exterior of the church is plain, in unfinished stone with walled up windows. The church interiors were refurbished with stuccoes in Baroque fashion by the school of the Brandani. The 17th-century frescoes were painted by Cialdieri and the main altarpiece depicting the Archangel Michael (1764) was painted by Gaetano Lapis.

References

Roman Catholic churches in Cagli